Becker v. Montgomery, 532 U.S. 757 (2001) is a Supreme Court case that addressed Rule 11(a) of the Federal Rules of Civil Procedure and whether the failure to sign a notice of appeal requires a court to dismiss the appeal.

Facts
Dale G. Becker, an Ohio prisoner, represented himself in a civil rights action to contest the conditions of his confinement. The United States District Court for the Southern District of Ohio dismissed Becker's complaint. Becker appealed, and filed his notice of appeal using a government-printed form. Where the form asked for "Counsel for Appellant" Becker typed his name but did not provide his signature. The District Court granted Becker leave to proceed in forma pauperis on appeal, but the Sixth Circuit Court of Appeals dismissed the appeal on its own motion, holding that the notice of appeal was fatally defective for lack of a signature, which the Court of Appeals deemed a 'jurisdictional' defect.

Opinion
In a unanimous opinion delivered by Justice Ginsburg, the Court held that the federal rules require signature on notice of appeal, but the failure of a party to sign timely notice of appeal did not require the Court of Appeals to dismiss, as the lapse was curable and not a jurisdictional impediment. The only rule of civil procedure requiring that all papers filed in the district court be signed is Rule 11(a), which requires the signing of notices of appeal; a signature requirement is not among the specifications for notices of appeal set forth in the appellate court rules. Rule 11(a) states that the omission of a signature may be corrected within 30 days of filing. Since Becker was never given the opportunity to correct the omission before the Sixth Circuit dismissed his appeal, the Court reversed the dismissal.  This was Justice Ginsburg's first majority opinion to cite an internet source.

References 

United States Supreme Court cases
2001 in United States case law